Powlesland is a surname of English origin. People with that name include:

 Dominic Powlesland (born 1954), British landscape archaeologist
 Ian Powlesland, British archaeologist who appeared in the TV series Time Team

See also
 Powlesland and Mason (railway shunting contractors), a defunct company once active in Swansea docks
 

Surnames of English origin